Ballet Jörgen Canada  was founded in 1987 by Susan Bodie and Bengt Jörgen and is based in Toronto, Ontario. The company also has hubs in Ottawa, Hamilton, Kitchener-Waterloo, and Halifax. It is Canada's fifth largest ballet company.

References

External links 
 http://www.balletjorgencanada.ca/

Jorgen, Ballet, Canada
1987 establishments in Ontario
Performing groups established in 1987